Gleyre is a surname. Notable people with the surname include: 

 Charles Gleyre (1806–1874), Swiss artist
 Marcel Gleyre (1910–1996), American gymnast